, formerly Global A Entertainment, is a video game development studio located in Kichijōji, Tokyo, Japan. On February 12, 2009, it was renamed to GAE, Inc. The company is most well known for its popular Dungeon Maker series. They also released the Cosmetick Paradise series and Akudaikan series (only in Japan). A recent notable game by the developer is My World My Way for Nintendo DS and PlayStation Portable.

Games developed under GAE, Inc.

 2000 - Iron Aces (Dreamcast)
 2000 - The Maestro Magic (PlayStation)
 2001 - Toy Robo Force (Game Boy Advance)
 2001 - The Maestro Magic Zwei (PlayStation 2)
 2001 - Tamtam Paradise (PlayStation 2)
 2001 - The Maestro Magic Encore Disc (PlayStation)
 2002 - Yuurei Yashiki no Nijuuyon Jikan (Game Boy Advance)
 2002 - Denki Blocks! (Game Boy Advance)
 2002 - Bouken! Dondoko Shima (Game Boy Color)
 2002 - Hanafuda Trump Mahjong: Depachika Wayounaka (Game Boy Advance)
 2002 - Nobunaga Ibun (Game Boy Advance)
 2002 - Innocent Tears (Xbox)
 2002 - Akudaikan (PlayStation 2)
 2002 - Minami no Umi no Odyssey (Game Boy Advance)
 2002 - Kaerazu no Mori (PlayStation 2)
 2003 - Fushigi no Kuni no Alice (Game Boy Advance)
 2003 - Rei Fighter Gekitsui Senki (GameCube)
 2003 - Fushigi no Kuni no Alice (PlayStation 2)
 2003 - Akudaikan 2 (PlayStation 2)
 2003 - Choaniki: Sei Naru Protein Densetsu (PlayStation 2)
 2003 - Cambrian QTS: Kaseki ni Nattemo (PlayStation 2)
 2004 - Daisan Teikoku Koubouki (PlayStation 2)
 2004 - Nobunaga Senki (PlayStation 2)
 2005 - Edomono (PlayStation 2)
 2006 - Akudaikan Manyuuki (PlayStation Portable)
 2006 - Chronicles of Dungeon Maker (PlayStation Portable)
 2006 - Jui Doctor Toumajou Tarou (PlayStation Portable)
 2006 - HEAVEN'S WILL (PlayStation Portable)
 2007 - Dungeon Maker: Hunting Ground (PlayStation Portable)
 2007 - Akudaikan Manyuuki: Seigi no Yaiba (PlayStation Portable)
 2007 - Akudaikan 3 (PlayStation 2)
 2007 - Kururin Doughnuts Okashi no Recipe (Nintendo DS)
 2007 - Cosmetick Paradise (Nintendo DS)
 2007 - Master of the Monster Lair (Nintendo DS)
 2007 - Gakken Rekishi Gunzou Presents: Monoshiri Sengoku Ou (Nintendo DS)
 2007 - Dungeon Maker II: The Hidden War (PlayStation Portable)
 2008 - Chishiki-Ou Series: Train Master (Nintendo DS)
 2008 - Zero Shiki Kanjou Sentouki Ni (PlayStation Portable)
 2008 - Gakken M Bunko: Monoshiri Edo Meijin (Nintendo DS)
 2008 - Gaekken Rekishi Gunzou Presents: Monoshiri Bakumatsu-Ou (Nintendo DS)
 2008 - Oookuki (PlayStation 2)
 2008 - My World My Way (Nintendo DS)
 2008 - Cosmetick Paradise ～Make no Kiseki～ (Nintendo DS)
 2008 - Gakken Mu Henshuubu Kanshuu: Choujou Genshou Research File (Nintendo DS)
 2008 - Adventure to Go! (PlayStation Portable)
 2008 - Zero Pilot: Daisanji Sekai Taisen 1946 (PlayStation Portable)
 2008 - Rekishi Gunzou Presents: Monoshiri San Goku Shi (Nintendo DS)
 2008 - Happy My Sweets (Nintendo DS)
 2009 - NANATAMA Chronicles of Dungeon Maker (PlayStation Portable)
 2009 - My World My Way (PlayStation Portable)
 2009 - Daikuugun (PlayStation Portable)
 2010 - Cosmetick Paradise ～Kirei ni Mahou～ (Nintendo DS)
 2010 - Akudaikan ～Omae no yome ha ore no mono!!～ (Mobile SNS)
 2011 - Cosmetick Paradise ～Princess Life～ (Nintendo DS)
 2011(TBA) - Bikkuri! Tobidasu! Mahou no Pen (Nintendo 3DS)

References

External links
GAE Official Japanese website

Video game companies of Japan